NCEC may refer to:

 National Chemical Emergency Centre
 National Committee for an Effective Congress